Atmosfear are a jazz funk/Brit funk band who formed in the United Kingdom in 1978. The band was formed by two friends Lester J. Batchelor Jr. and Raymond Johnson two soul boys on the London Soul and jazz Funk music scene in the late 1970's, both were regular club goers and record collectors. Ray was a well known dancer and dance skater, Lester was a design student. They would hang out at local clubs such as Scamps, Bobby McGees, The Global Village, Wag and Billy's in London. 

Lester and Ray regularly got together to play at Ray's home in South Harrow and would invite other musician friends to join them, so various guitarists and keyboard players would pop in at the weekends when they played to make up an ad hoc full band line up as and when availability dictated. They called themselves G-Force back then and became quite popular in the local area, even though they were not yet performing publicly. Their confidence grew and Lester and Ray started to create their own compositions, and validation was the order of the day - they wanted to get some feedback for their creations. So Ray introduced his friend Jerry Pike to Lester and they arranged to meet so that Jerry could listen to their stuff. Jerry was a phenomenal record collector who worked at All Ears record store in Harlesden north west London. Jerry was immediately impressed and started visiting to listen in on more and more sessions. Lester and Ray decided to move out of Ray's home make-shift rehearsal space of his parents lounge to find a regular space to play, and Jerry suggested meeting Andy Sojka his boss. Jerry introduced the boys to Andy Sojka the co-owner of All Ears record store in Harlesden. Andy who played guitar sat in on a session with Lester and Ray and within a few weeks liked what he heard and offered the boys use of his empty garage in Wembley. This was a short lived location for the budding musicians, Sojka's neighbours were not as welcoming.

The collective were becoming serious about the music and Lester was very keen to develop the band further, so Andy offered the use of the storeroom behind the All Ears record store, so Lester and Ray got to work to clear up the room to create a bona fide rehearsal space. This became the new home of the band and Lester came up with a new name 'AT>MOS>FEAR' The name had to be different hence the spelling and it had to create some mystique & intrigue. Jerry invited a keyboard player to sit in, who just happened to also be friends with Lester they were at college together - Peter Hinds. The threesome - Lester, Ray and Peter would rehearse at the back of the store at the end of the day when the store was closed, but sometimes they would play their original compositions when the punters were in the store, just to get an idea of what the public were hearing too. This was a very useful validation for Atmosfear's music.

They original line up consisted of band leader, bassist, and keyboardist Lester J. Batchelor, drummer Ray Johnson, saxophonist Stewart Cawthorne, producer Jerry Pike and guitarist Andy Sojka, a figure on the Brit funk scene, who owned the All Ears dance music import shop in Harlesden at the time. The Elite record label was originally created as a marketing and distribution vehicle to release Atmosfear Music, and following the meteoric success of Atmosfear it quickly became a mecca of independent new unsigned local artists.

A year later singer and guitarist Tony Antoniou joined the main line up. Regular support musician / members of the band were lester's friends - keyboardist Peter Hinds, who has also been a member of UK jazz funk pioneers Light of the World and Incognito, and percussionist Leroy Williams, a member of UK soul band Hi-Tension, who had also played with Level 42, a band Sojka was introduced to following Atmosfear signing a recording deal with MCA records. A representative of MCA was closely linked with Phil Gould and Boon Gould, drummer and guitarist with Level 42 , named and had signed to his record label before they had a deal with Polydor. They were sometimes joined by horn man Alan Rapoport, Frank Roccoti, Rick Dejong and singer Carol Kenyon.

Their most notable release was "Dancing In Outer Space", which reached the Top 50 of the UK Singles Chart in 1979. A double A-sided single followed, "Motivation" / "Extract" which did not chart. This track also became BBC Radio 1 DJ, Pete Tong's club track of the year, when it was released where Tong appeared at a nightclub close to Brands Hatch.

Following a major disagreement with Andy Sojka, the main group line up changed completely, when bassist Lester Batchelor left soon after the release of the single "Xtra Special" which he penned. The different version of the track was recorded in the United States with the vocals provided by Dolette McDonald.

In the mid 1990s, Sojka set up three new dance music labels called Meta4, Chemical Discs and Jump Cut, with the latter releasing an album by Atmosfear called Trance Plants in 1994 and Meta4 releasing the act's Jangala Spirits in 1997. In the late 1990s, a remix project called Altered Slates, managed to get "Dancing In Outer Space" re-charting low down the Top 100 with mixes from Masters at Work's Louie Vega and Kenny 'Dope' Gonzales, who had sampled "Motivation" on their Bucketheads album track "I Wanna Know" a couple of years before the record re-charted. Also involved with the Altered Slates project were producer Francois Kevorkian and Dimitri from France.

In February 2000, Sojka died of multiple myeloma aged 48, while in the middle of recording a new Atmosfear album called Groove World.

In 2019, Bachelor debuted a new line-up of Atmosfear, and booked a number of live dates for 2020, which had to be rescheduled. He also released a new version of "Dancing In Outer Space" called "DIOS:2020" which featured Francesco Mendolia from Incognito alongside Orphy ‘Vibes’ Robinson MBE, Antonello Filaccio, Dee Byrne, Kenny Barry and Shelley 'Deeizm' Debenham.

Discography
 "First" / "Foremost" (12" single) – Elite 	 
 "Dancing In Outer Space" (7" and 12" single) – Elite/MCA Records (1979) - UK number 46
 "Dancing In Outer Space" / "Can't Live Without Your Love" (12") – Elektra	(1980)
 "Motivation" (12") – Elite (1980)
 "Motivation" / "Extract" (12") – MCA Records (1980)
 En Trance (LP) – MCA Records (1981)
 "Invasion" (12") – Elite (1981)
 "Xtra Special" (12") – Elite (1982)
 "What Do We Do" (12") – Chrysalis (1983)
 "What Do We Do" (12") – Elite (1983)
 "Telepathy" (12") – Elite (1984)
 "When Tonight Is Over" (12") – Elite (1984)
 "Cuts Like a Knife" (12") – Elite (1986)
 "Personal Column" / "Dancing In Outer Space" (12") – Elite (1986)
 "Personal Column" / "Dancing In Outer Space" (12", Promo, W/Lbl, Sta) – Elite (1986)
 "Kickin' It" (12") – JamToday (1988)
 "Planet Mental (Outa This World)" / "Dancing In Outer Space" (12") – JamToday (1989)
 "Dancing In Outer Space" (12", W/Lbl, Sta) – Chemical Discs (1991)
 "The Re-Entry XP" (12") – Chemical Discs (1991)
 Dancing In Outer Space (The Finest Hour) (album) – Jump Cut (1995)
 "Altered Slates – Part Five" (12") – Disorient (1997)
 "Dancing In Outer Space (The Masters At Work Remixes)" (various formats) – Disorient (1997) - UK number 82
 "Altered Slates Part Three (François K Remixes)" (12") – Disorient (1998)
 "Invasion" (12") – Discfunction (1998)
 "Motivation (Dimitri From Paris Remixes)" (12") -	Disorient (1998)
 "Motivation (Dimitri From Paris Remixes) (2x12", W/Lbl, Ltd) – Disorient (1998)
 Altered Slates (album) – Disorient (1999)
 Dancing In Outer Space (album) – Castle Music (2000)
 "Dancing In Outer Space" (12") – Castle Music (2001)
 "Ichi Sampler EP" (12", EP) – Disorient (2002)
 En Trance (album) – Discothèque (2) (2005)
 "DIOS:2020" (single) - Atmosfear (2020)

References

External links
Atmosfear: Groove With No Fear

English funk musical groups
English pop music groups